Luc Ihorst (born 7 March 2000) is a German professional footballer who plays as a forward for  club Eintracht Braunschweig.

Career
A youth product for Bundesliga club Werder Bremen, Ihorst made his debut for Werder Bremen II, the club's reserve side, on 27 July 2019 in a Regionalliga Nord against Lüneburger SK Hansa. He scored his first goal for Werder Bremen II on 31 August 2019 against Schwarz-Weiß Rehden. His 22nd-minute goal was the second in a 3–1 victory.

On 21 September 2019, Ihorst was called up to Werder Bremen's first-team and started on the bench in a Bundesliga match against RB Leipzig. He came on as an 80th-minute substitute for Josh Sargent to make his professional debut.

In August 2020, Ihorst agreed a contract extension with Werder Bremen and joined 2. Bundesliga side VfL Osnabrück on a two-year loan. He made 18 league appearances scoring two goals.

In June 2021 it was announced he would join Eintracht Braunschweig, newly relegated to the 3. Liga, on loan for the 2021–22 season. During the season, he was troubled by injuries and scored 3 goals in 19 league appearances while his club secured a return to the 2. Bundesliga thanks to placing third.

In June 2022 Ihorst's permanent move to Eintracht Braunschweig was announced. He signed a two-year contract.

Career statistics

References

External links
 
 

Living people
2000 births
Association football forwards
German footballers
SV Werder Bremen II players
SV Werder Bremen players
VfL Osnabrück players
Eintracht Braunschweig players
Bundesliga players
2. Bundesliga players
3. Liga players
Regionalliga players